Sopho "Sofia" Nizharadze is a Georgian singer, actress, and songwriter who represented Georgia in the Eurovision Song Contest 2010 with the song "Shine". Nizharadze was a judge on the TV shows Georgia's Got Talent', 'Only Georgian' and 'The X Factor Georgia.

Early life

Born in Tbilisi, Georgia, Nizharadze started singing at a very early age. Her mother who was a big push to her in her singing career. She graduated with honors from the Musical Academy under the Tbilisi State Conservatory where she studied piano and vocals. She later continued her studies at the Academy of Theatre and Arts in Russia (GITIS) and graduated with honors from the Gnessin State Musical College in Moscow.

Through her singing she has brought international attention to Georgia.

Nizharadze's great-grandmother, Dürye, was of Turkish origin who immigrated to Tsarist Russia during the Ottoman Empire. She married the son of a Georgian-born professor and then settled in Georgia. In 2010, Nizharadze was reunited with her Turkish relatives on the Beyaz Show during her Eurovision tour in Turkey.

Music career

Nizharadze's vocal range is light lyric soprano.

At the age of three, Nizharadze started performing as a professional with very positive reception. At the age of seven she was invited by Jansug Kakhidze, a prominent Georgian conductor and author of famous sound tracks for Georgian cinema, to join a children's music studio where she took the lead as a vocalist for various shows and TV projects.

At age 11, she performed "Sous le ciel de Paris" at the French Embassy, where she was noticed by journalist Bernard Pivot who invited her to his program on TV5.

By the time she turned 17 years old, Nizharadze had won several international young singer's contests, including the "Bravo, Bravissimo!" competition in Mini La Scala (Italy), "Crystal Note" (Moscow, Russia) and "Crystal Fur-tree" (Borjomi, Georgia). She participated in several festivals in Russia, Turkey, Italy, Latvia and Georgia.

Later, she took leading parts in the musicals The Wedding of the Jays and Roméo et Juliette, de la Haine à l'Amour. Living in Moscow at that moment she started gaining international recognition as a singer.

In 2004, she got a main part in Gerard Presgurvic's musical (Original Russian Version, Operetta Theatre, leading cast). In 2005, she reached the final in the New Wave Festival in Jūrmala, Latvia.

In 2008, Nizharadze gave up her career in Russia and returned to Georgia due to the ongoing war between the two countries.

She performed "The Star-Spangled Banner" during Vice President Joe Biden's official visit to Georgia.

Eurovision Song Contest 2010

Nizharadze was chosen by GPB to represent Georgia in the Eurovision Song Contest 2010. An open call for songs was launched, and over 100 entries submitted, the broadcasting authorities selected six, that were all performed by her in a national final on 27 February in the Tbilisi Even Hall. "Shine" was voted as the winner.

2010: After Eurovision
In celebration of her performance at Eurovision, President of Georgia Mikheil Saakashvili suggested that Nizharadze was being considered for appointment as the nation's Minister of Culture.

Nizharadze performs at events throughout Europe and Asia. She has sung duets with José Carreras, Andrea Bocelli, Chris de Burgh and Julio Iglesias. In 2013 she recorded a single "When We Danced." She released a new album with this single and also with Eurovision Song Contest hit "Shine" in March 2014.

In 2016 she was a judge at the Georgian format of X Factor alongside Nika Gvaramia, Nina Sublatti and Giorgi Gabunia.

Awards and achievements

 1995: "Crystal fir tree", the international festival nominated at the "Best Vocal" category
 1996: Special award – "The League", the first Georgian festival; award owner at the festival Mini La Scala
 1997: participant of "Crystal note" International Festival in Moscow (850 anniversary of Moscow city)
 1999: Diploma of the First category for the best vocal within the frame of the festival "Pushkin weeks"; Diploma of the Tbilisi Mayor's Office for the "Unique vocal features”
 1998: 2001- Scholarship of President Eduard Shevardnadze
 2000: "Golden Star" for the best vocal granted by Forte Cinematographic Studio and Star Scale Studio
 2003–2004: leading part in the musical The Wedding of the Jays
 2004–2006: leading part on Roméo et Juliette, de la Haine à l'Amour The Musical
 2005: participant, a finalist of the young pop star contest at the New Wave Festival
 2005–2007: leading parts in shows and production of RATI; was invited for Esmeralda part to the Musical Notre Dame De Paris
 2010: performed a duet with José Carreras, extract from the musical West Side Story
 2010: performed with Chris De Burgh
 2011: performed with Andrea Bocelli
 2012: performed a duet with Julio Iglesias
 2012–2013: leading role in Redha Bentifour's musical Melodies of Vera District
 2013: recorded single "When We Danced" and a music video with the participation Joaquin Cortes
 unknown: main role in the first Georgian musical Keto and Kote

Stage roles
 Musical Svadba Soek "The Wedding of the Jays" (Ketevan – main role)
 Musical Romeo & Juliette – Juliet (Original Russian Main Cast)
 Musical Hello, Dolly (RATI)
 Keto and Kote The Musical (Keto – leading role)
 Melodies of Vera District The Musical by Redha Benteifour (Vardo – leading role)

Albums
 The Wedding of the Jays Original Cast Recording (2003)
 Musical Romeo & Juliette "Ot Nenavisti Do Lubvi" Original Cast Recording (2005)
 Where are you... (2008)
Track listing:
"My Dream"
"Every Moment"
"Where Are You..."
"Leave Me Alone"
"I'm Running Away"
"Over and Over"
"Leave Me Alone (rmx)"
"Over and Over (rmx)"
 We Are All (2014)
Track listing:
"No Way Out"
"Hero"
"Why Won't You Love Me"
"When We Danced"
"We Are All"
"Without Your Love"
"The Reason I Go On"
"Shine"
"So in Love"
"Call Me"
"Without Your Love (Remix)"
"Two of a Kind"

Personal life
On December 31, 2021, Mikheil Saakashvili recognized to have an extramarital daughter, Elis-Maria, with Sofia Nizharadze, calling her "my most lovely girl and youngest child".

References

External links

Sofia Nizharadze Official Website 
Official Facebook Page
The Sofia Nizharadze official myspace
Sofia Nizharadze official Eurovision.Tv page 
www.sofianizharadze.ru Russian/English site 

Living people
Georgian people of Turkish descent
21st-century actresses from Georgia (country)
21st-century women singers from Georgia (country)
Eurovision Song Contest entrants of 2010
Pop singers from Georgia (country)
Musicians from Tbilisi
Eurovision Song Contest entrants for Georgia (country)
Television actresses from Georgia (country)
Actors from Tbilisi
Stage actresses from Georgia (country)
Film actresses from Georgia (country)
Musical theatre actresses
1985 births